For other Suffolk County location elections see, Suffolk County (disambiguation)

Suffolk County Council in England is elected every four years. Since the last boundary changes in 2005, 75 councillors have been elected from 75 wards.

Political control
Since 1973 political control of the council has been held by the following parties:

Leadership
The leaders of the council since 1984 have been:

County Council composition

Composition since 1973

County result maps

By-election results

1993-1997

1997-2001

2001-2005

2005-2009

2009-2013

2013-2017

2017-2021

2022-2025

References

By-election results

External links
Suffolk County Council

 
Council elections in Suffolk
County council elections in England